Sweetwater County is a county in southwestern Wyoming, United States. As of the 2020 United States Census, the population was 42,272, making it the fourth-most populous county in Wyoming. Its county seat is Green River. By area, it is the largest county in Wyoming. Its southern boundary line abuts the north lines of the states of Colorado and Utah.

Sweetwater County comprises the Rock Springs, Green River, Wyoming Micropolitan Statistical Area.

History
Sweetwater County was created on December 17, 1867, as a county within the Dakota Territory. The county was formed of territory partitioned from Laramie County. The county was originally named Carter County for Judge W.A. Carter of Fort Bridger In 1869, the newly established legislature of the Wyoming Territory renamed the county for the Sweetwater River.

Also in 1869, Uinta County was organized with land ceded by Sweetwater County. Johnson County, originally named Pease County, was formed from parts of Sweetwater and Carbon counties in 1875. In 1884, Sweetwater County lost territory when Fremont County was created. Sweetwater County also lost territory when its boundary with Carbon County was adjusted in 1886. County boundaries were also adjusted in 1909, 1911, and 1951.

South Pass City was the county seat from 1867 until 1873, when the county seat was moved to Green River.

Geography
The largest county in Wyoming, Sweetwater County is larger than six states and is the eighth-largest county in the United States (not including boroughs and census areas in Alaska). Most of the Great Divide Basin lies within the county, comprising the county's northeast quadrant.

Adjacent counties

 Fremont County (north)
 Carbon County (east)
 Moffat County, Colorado (south)
 Daggett County, Utah (southwest)
 Summit County, Utah (west-southwest)
 Uinta County (southwest)
 Lincoln County (west)
 Sublette County (northwest)

Major Highways
  Interstate 80

  U.S. Highway 30
  U.S. Highway 191
  Wyoming Highway 28
  Wyoming Highway 370
  Wyoming Highway 371
  Wyoming Highway 372
  Wyoming Highway 414
  Wyoming Highway 430
  Wyoming Highway 530
  Wyoming Highway 789

National protected areas
 Ashley National Forest (part)
 Flaming Gorge National Recreation Area (part)
 Seedskadee National Wildlife Refuge

Demographics

2000 census
As of the 2000 United States Census, of 2000, there were 37,613 people, 14,105 households, and 10,099 families in the county. The population density was 4 people per square mile (1/km2). There were 15,921 housing units at an average density of 2 per square mile (1/km2). The racial makeup of the county was 91.62% White, 0.73% Black or African American, 1.01% Native American, 0.64% Asian, 0.04% Pacific Islander, 3.59% from other races, and 2.37% from two or more races. 9.42% of the population were Hispanic or Latino of any race. 16.4% are of English, 16.2% German, 9% Irish and 5% Italian ancestry.

There were 14,105 households, out of which 38.20% had children under the age of 18 living with them, 57.80% were married couples living together, 9.20% had a female householder with no husband present, and 28.40% were non-families. 23.60% of all households were made up of individuals, and 6.90% had someone living alone who was 65 years of age or older. The average household size was 2.62 and the average family size was 3.11.

The county population contained 28.90% under the age of 18, 10.10% from 18 to 24, 29.30% from 25 to 44, 23.70% from 45 to 64, and 8.00% who were 65 years of age or older. The median age was 34 years. For every 100 females there were 102.40 males. For every 100 females age 18 and over, there were 101.10 males.

The median income for a household in the county was $46,537, and the median income for a family was $54,173. Males had a median income of $45,678 versus $22,440 for females. The per capita income for the county was $19,575. About 5.40% of families and 7.80% of the population were below the poverty line, including 9.20% of those under age 18 and 7.00% of those age 65 or over.

2010 census
As of the 2010 United States Census, there were 43,806 people, 16,475 ;households, and 11,405 families in the county. The racial makeup of the county was 88.5% white, 1.0% American Indian, 1.0% black or African American, 0.8% Asian, 0.1% Pacific islander, 6.4% from other races, and 2.3% from two or more races. Those of Hispanic or Latino origin made up 15.3% of the population. In terms of ancestry, 22.4% were German, 19.0% were English, 13.0% were Irish, 7.4% were Italian, and 4.4% were American.

Of the 16,475 households, 36.7% had children under the age of 18 living with them, 53.5% were married couples living together, 9.0% had a female householder with no husband present, 30.8% were non-families, and 24.0% of all households were made up of individuals. The average household size was 2.62 and the average family size was 3.09. The median age was 32.8 years.

The median income for a household in the county was $69,828 and the median income for a family was $79,527. Males had a median income of $65,174 versus $31,738 for females. The per capita income for the county was $30,961. About 6.1% of families and 8.2% of the population were below the poverty line, including 12.0% of those under age 18 and 5.0% of those age 65 or over.

Politics and government
Sweetwater County was a Democratic stronghold in Wyoming until recent years, voting Democratic in eleven consecutive presidential elections between 1928 and 1968, after supporting Progressive Robert La Follette Sr. in 1924. In 1928, 1952, 1956 and 1976 it was the only Wyoming county to support the Democratic presidential nominee.

Nonetheless, no Democratic presidential candidate has won Sweetwater County since Bill Clinton in 1996. In 2016, Hillary Clinton won just 18.9 percent of the vote in the county. At the state level, Sweetwater County is represented by one Democrat, four Republicans and one Libertarian in the Wyoming House of Representatives, and three Republicans in the Wyoming Senate.

County commissioners

Communities

Cities
 Creston
 Green River (county seat)
 Rock Springs

Towns

 Bairoil
 Granger
 Superior
 Wamsutter

Census-designated places

 Arrowhead Springs
 Clearview Acres
 Eden
 Farson
 James Town
 Little America
 McKinnon
 North Rock Springs
 Point of Rocks
 Purple Sage
 Reliance
 Table Rock
 Washam

Other unincorporated communities

 Blairtown
 Creston
 Quealy
 Red Desert
 Riner
 Sweeney Ranch

Ghost towns

 Bryan
 Linwood (mostly within the State of Utah)
 Table Rock
 Winton

Media

Print
Sweetwater County is served by two print publications: Rock Springs Daily Rocket-Miner and The Green River Star (a weekly newspaper published in Green River).

Hyperlocal websites
Sweetwater County is served by a hyperlocal news websites, SweetwaterNOW.com and wyo4news.com.

See also

 National Register of Historic Places listings in Sweetwater County, Wyoming
Wyoming
List of cities and towns in Wyoming
List of counties in Wyoming
Wyoming statistical areas

References

Further reading

External links

 

 
1867 establishments in Dakota Territory
Populated places established in 1867